Mangga, or Mangga Buang, is an Oceanic language in Morobe Province, Papua New Guinea.

References

South Huon Gulf languages
Languages of Morobe Province